Virginia Field (born Margaret Cynthia Field; 4 November 1917 – 2 January 1992) was a British-born film actress.

Early years
An only child, born in London, her father was Sir John Field. He was the judge of Leicester County Court Circuit. Her mother was a cousin of Confederate General Robert E. Lee and her aunt was British stage actress and director Auriol Lee.

She was educated in Paris, Vienna, and the South of France, and then returned to England, where she studied for the stage. In Vienna, she acted for Max Reinhardt, and on returning to Britain, she was given her first film role whilst in her teens in The Lady is Willing, followed by a Hollywood contract.

Film
Field went to the U.S. to appear in David O. Selznick's Little Lord Fauntleroy (1936). In the late 1930s, she appeared in various parts in 20th Century Fox's Mr. Moto film series. Field played Kitty, a ballerina with Vivien Leigh in the 1940 film, Waterloo Bridge. In 1941, Field played Nell Gwyn in Hudson's Bay. Vincent Price was cast as King Charles II, and he wrote about the experience in his book The Book of Joe. "...I came up against my first animals, a whole litter of King Charles spaniels... But my competition was not the spaniels, who were indeed adorable, but the enormous bosoms of the young lady who played Nell Gwyn. They were of such robust and luscious proportions and her dress so low cut that in our big scene, in which we fondled the puppies on a great bed, she leaned over them so far that the censors cut the scene out of the picture."

Television
During the Perry Mason series on CBS from 1957–1966, Field made six guest appearances. She played Irene Collaro in the 1958 episode "The Case of the Prodigal Parent".  In both the 1960 episode, "The Case of the Provocative Protege", and the 1962 episode, "The Case of the Polka Dot Pony", she played the murderess. In the 1964 episode, "The Case of the Simple Simon", Field played the role of Mason's client and defendant Ramona Carver. She also appeared as Lotta Langley in an episode of the ABC series The Rebel, starring Nick Adams.

Field was a regular participant on Pantomime Quiz, and had the role of Josephine Dunning in the pilot for Meet the Girls, a comedy aired on CBS in August 1960.

Recognition
Field has a star at 1751 Vine Street, Los Angeles on the Hollywood Walk of Fame, dedicated 8 February 1960.

Marriages
Field married three times. Her spouses included actors Paul Douglas and Willard Parker. Douglas and she had a daughter, Margaret Field Douglas (born 1945). In 1947, she married Howard Grode, a composer and musician.

Death
Field died of cancer on 2 January 1992. She was cremated and her ashes scattered at sea.

Filmography

 The Primrose Path (1934) – Ianthe Dorland
 The Lady Is Willing (1934) – Maid (uncredited)
 Little Lord Fauntleroy (1936) – Miss Herbert
 Sing, Baby, Sing (1936) – Farraday's Nurse (uncredited)
 Thank You, Jeeves! (1936) – Marjorie Lowman
 Ladies in Love (1936) – Countess Helena
 Lloyd's of London (1936) – Polly
 Career Woman (1936) – Fifi Brown
 Think Fast, Mr. Moto (1937) – Gloria Danton
 London by Night (1937) – Bessie
 Lancer Spy (1937) – Joan Bruce
 Ali Baba Goes to Town (1937) – Dinah
 Charlie Chan at Monte Carlo (1937) – Evelyn Grey
 Mr. Moto's Last Warning (1939) – Connie
 Bridal Suite (1939) – Abbie Bragdon
 Captain Fury (1939) – Mabel
 The Sun Never Sets (1939) – Phyllis
 Mr. Moto Takes a Vacation (1939) – Eleanore Kirke
 Eternally Yours (1939) – Lola De Vere
 The Cisco Kid and the Lady (1939) – Billie Graham
 Waterloo Bridge (1940) – Kitty
 Dance, Girl, Dance (1940) – Elinor Harris
 Hudson's Bay (1941) – Nell Gwyn
 Knockout (1941) – Gloria Van Ness
 Singapore Woman (1941) – Claire Weston
 Atlantic Convoy (1942) – Lida Adams
 The Crystal Ball (1943) – Jo Ainsley
 Stage Door Canteen (1943) – Herself
 Ladies' Man (1947) – Gladys Hayden
 The Perfect Marriage (1947) – Gloria
 The Imperfect Lady (1947) – Rose Bridges
 Repeat Performance (1947) – Paula Costello
 Variety Girl (1947) – Variety Girl
 Christmas Eve (1947) – Claire
 Dream Girl (1948) – Miriam Allerton Lucas
 John Loves Mary (1949) – Lilly Herbish
 A Connecticut Yankee in King Arthur's Court (1949) – Morgan Le Fay
 Dial 1119 (1950) – Freddy
 The Lady Pays Off (1951) – Kay Stoddard
 Week-End with Father (1951) – Phyllis Reynolds
 The Veils of Bagdad (1953) – Rosanna
 Appointment with a Shadow (1957) – Florence Knapp
 Rockabilly Baby (1957) – Eleanor Carter aka Dixie West
 The Explosive Generation (1961) – Mrs. Katie Sommers
 The Earth Dies Screaming (1964) – Peggy Hatton

References

External links

 
 

1917 births
1992 deaths
Deaths from cancer in California
English film actresses
English television actresses
Actresses from London
People from Palm Desert, California
20th-century English actresses
British expatriate actresses in the United States
British expatriates in Austria
British expatriates in France